Stanley Marc Perlman is an American microbiologist and coronavirus researcher. He is professor of microbiology and immunology, professor of pediatrics, and the Mark Stinski Chair in Virology in the Roy J. and Lucille A. Carver College of Medicine at the University of Iowa. He has been researching coronaviruses for 38 years. He is a fellow of the American Academy of Microbiology and a member of the American Society for Microbiology.

References

External links
Faculty page
Lab website

Living people
American microbiologists
American immunologists
Roy J. and Lucille A. Carver College of Medicine faculty
University of Rochester alumni
Massachusetts Institute of Technology alumni
Leonard M. Miller School of Medicine alumni
Year of birth missing (living people)
Coronavirus researchers